Disney Sports Football, known in Japan as , is a pair of 2002 sports video games released in 2002 by Konami, one for the GameCube, and one for the Game Boy Advance. The game introduced Scrooge McDuck from DuckTales, José Carioca from Saludos Amigos, Mortimer Mouse from the Mickey Mouse Cartoons, the Big Bad Wolf from The Three Little Pigs and the alligators from Fantasia, though they have no lines.

Gameplay
The game features Disney characters including Mickey Mouse, Minnie Mouse, Donald Duck and Goofy playing major league American football. Players pick a team to play in Challenge, Cup, Exhibition, and Practice modes against a number of opposing teams, and have a choice of magic items to help their team. The game includes commentary.

Teams
 The Superstars (Mickey Mouse)
 The Charmers (Minnie Mouse)
 The Seaducks (Donald Duck)
 The Belles (Daisy Duck)
 The Spacenuts (Goofy)
 The Lords (Max Goof)
 The TinyRockets (Huey, Dewey, and Louie, Scrooge McDuck and José Carioca)
 The Steamrollers (Pete)
 The Imperials (Mortimer Mouse)
 The Wolfgangs (Big Bad Wolf)
 The Headhunters (Alligators from Fantasia, but led by one named Boss instead of Ben Ali Gator)
 Mickey's All-Stars (Mickey, Minnie, Donald, Daisy, Goofy and Max)
 Pete's All-Stars (Pete, Mortimer, Big Bad Wolf and Boss)

Reception

The game received "mixed" reviews on both platforms according to the review aggregation website Metacritic. In Japan, Famitsu gave it a score of 22 out of 40 for the Game Boy Advance version, and 28 out of 40 for the GameCube version.

References

External links
 

2002 video games
Disney sports video games
Donald Duck video games
Game Boy Advance games
GameCube games
Goofy (Disney) video games
Konami games
Mickey Mouse video games
Multiplayer and single-player video games
Games with GameCube-GBA connectivity